HMAS Yarra (U77), named for the Yarra River, was a  sloop of the Royal Australian Navy (RAN) that served during World War II. Commissioned in 1936, Yarra spent the early part of the war in Australian waters, then was transferred to the East Indies Station in 1940. The sloop operated in the Red Sea, then was involved in the Anglo-Iraqi War and the Anglo-Soviet invasion of Iran. After operating as part of the Tobruk Ferry Service in the Mediterranean during November, Yarra was reassigned to Southeast Asia in response to Japanese attacks. On 4 March 1942, Yarra was attacked and sunk by a force of Japanese cruisers and destroyers while attempting to protect ships withdrawing to Australia.

Design and construction

The Grimsby class consisted of thirteen sloops, four of which were built in Australia for the RAN. Propulsion machinery consisted of two Admiralty 3-drum boilers connected to Parsons geared turbines, which delivered  to the sloop's two propeller shafts. The ship's company in peacetime consisted of 135 officers and sailors; this increased to 160 during the war.

Yarras armament consisted of three QF  Mk V anti-aircraft guns along with small calibre weapons.

Yarra was laid down by the Cockatoo Island Dockyard at Sydney, New South Wales on 24 May 1934, launched on 28 March 1935 by Florence Parkhill, the wife of Archdale Parkhill, Minister for Defence, and commissioned into the RAN on 21 January 1936.

Operational history
In December 1939, Yarra was attached to the 20th Minesweeping Flotilla. On 28 August 1940, the sloop sailed from Fremantle for service on the East Indies Station. She arrived in Aden on 18 September, then was assigned to convoy operations in the Red Sea.

On 20 October, Yarra was part of the escort for Allied convoy BN 7. The convoy was attacked by a force of Italian destroyers; these were driven off, with the  forced aground. During the action, two torpedoes were fired by the Italians at Yarra; the sloop successfully evaded both.

From March until April 1941, Yarra was docked at Bombay for refitting. On 12 April, the sloop joined the escort of Convoy BP7 from Karachi to the port of Basra, in the Persian Gulf. After arriving in the gulf, Yarra became involved in the Anglo-Iraqi War. During August, the ship operated in Iranian waters in support of the Anglo-Soviet invasion. The sloop secured several ports and oil-producing facilities, sank the sloop , and was involved in the capture of two Iranian gunboats and the Italian ship Hilda. In November, the sloop was transferred to the Mediterranean, and operated as part of the Tobruk Ferry Service.

In December, the Japanese declaration of war saw Yarra reassigned to Southeast Asia. She left Alexandria on 9 December and reached Java on 11 January 1942, where she commenced convoy escort duties. On 5 February, the sloop escorted a convoy to Singapore; the last convoy to arrive before the city was captured by the Japanese. While en route, the convoy was attacked by Japanese aircraft: Yarra shot down one and damaged several others, then rescued over 1,800 soldiers from the burning troopship . On 6 February, the sloop left Singapore with a southbound convoy. Yarra left the convoy when near Palembang to take up the tow of the disabled destroyer , with the two ships successfully reaching Tanjong Priok.

Loss
The deterioration of the Allied position in Southeast Asia promoted a general withdrawal south. On 2 March, Yarra arrived at Tjilatjap with the depot ship Anking, the tanker Francol, and the minesweeper MMS-51: the sloop was ordered to escort the other three ships to Fremantle. A day later, the ship rescued forty survivors of the Dutch ship Paragi from liferafts.

Yarras commander, Robert William Rankin, laid down a smokescreen, then ordered the convoy to scatter while the sloop held off the Japanese warships. Despite the efforts of Yarra, the other three Allied ships were pursued and sunk, and the sloop was sunk by cruiser gunfire shortly after 08:00, with only 34 survivors from the ship's company and the Paragi rescuees. Attrition reduced the number of survivors to 13 by the time they were rescued on 9 March by the Dutch submarine .

The sloop's wartime service was later recognised with two battle honours: "Libya 1941" and "East Indies 1942". In March 2013, Governor-General Quentin Bryce announced that a Unit Citation for Gallantry would be retroactively awarded to the ship's company of Yarra at the time of her sinking. This was presented to the Chief of Navy and the ship's company of the minehunter , on the River Yarra, on 4 March 2014, the anniversary of the sloop Yarras loss.

Citations

References

Further reading

External links
Royal Australian Navy webpage for HMAS Yarra (U77)
The mighty minnow that took on a Japanese fleet
 The loss of HMAS Yarra, 4 March 1942 Australian War Memorial
 

Grimsby-class sloops of the Royal Australian Navy
World War II shipwrecks in the Indian Ocean
1935 ships
Recipients of the Unit Citation for Gallantry
Maritime incidents in March 1942